Pedro II Pitões (fl. 1147) was the Bishop of Porto at the time of the Second Crusade. In June 1147, he convinced the Flemish, Frisian, Norman, English, and Scottish crusaders that had landed at Porto to advance to Lisbon with King Afonso I of Portugal.

Catholic Church in Portugal
Christians of the Second Crusade
People from Porto
People of the Reconquista
Bishops of Porto
12th-century Portuguese people